The Paracas Candelabra, also called the Candelabra of the Andes, is a well-known prehistoric geoglyph found on the northern face of the Paracas Peninsula at Pisco Bay in Peru. Pottery found nearby has been radio carbon dated to 200 BCE, the time of the Paracas culture. The design is cut  into the soil, with stones possibly from a later date placed around it.

A variety of popular myths have arisen about the geoglyph.

History

A variety of popular myths have arisen about the geoglyph: one attributes it to José de San Martín, a 19th-century leader in the fight for independence; another suggests it is a Masonic symbol; and yet another that sailors created it as a sign which they could view at sea for landfall. Some believe it represents the motif known as a Mesoamerican world tree.

Although the exact age of the Candelabra geoglyph is unknown, archaeologists have found pottery around the site dating to around 200 BCE.  This pottery likely belonged to the Paracas people. It is not known if they constructed the geoglyph. 

The purpose of the Candelabra's creation is also unknown. It is thought most likely to represent the trident, a lightning rod of the god Viracocha. He was long an important figure in indigenous mythology throughout South America, both before and during the time of the Inca Empire. It has also been suggested that the Candelabra was built as a sign to sailors, as it is visible from far at sea. It may be a symbolic representation of the hallucinogenic plant called Jimsonweed.

See also
Nazca Lines

References

External links

 http://www.kmatthews.org.uk/cult_archaeology/out_of_place_artefacts_13.html

Geoglyphs
Archaeological sites in Ica Region
Archaeological sites in Peru
Hill figures
Tourist attractions in Ica Region